Karosa B 831 is citybus, which was made in three pieces by bus manufacturer Karosa between 1987-1989. It was intended as successor of Karosa B 731 and with trolleybus Škoda 17Tr had to be part of unificated series of city vehicles. Until now survived only one, which is placed in muzeum in Brno.

Construction features

See also 

 List of buses

References 

Buses manufactured by Karosa
Buses of the Czech Republic